Round Island Lighthouse stood from 1859 to 1998 on the southwest end of Round Island in the Mississippi Sound,  south of Pascagoula, Mississippi. In September 1998, the lighthouse was toppled by Hurricane Georges.  In 2010, the base of the structure and other lighthouse remnants were removed from Round Island and relocated within the City of Pascagoula for restoration.

History

Construction
In 1833, the United States Lighthouse Board contracted for construction of a lighthouse on Round Island in the Mississippi Sound. By 1854, the Lighthouse Board determined that the structure was poorly built and was too close to the water, which eroded the foundation. Construction of a second lighthouse along with a keeper's dwelling was contracted and completed in 1859 at a cost of $7,130.97.

Operation
Up until the 1920s, when most lighthouses were converted to electric power, various forms of oil (sperm oil, rapeseed oil, lard, and kerosene) were burned as illuminants.

During the American Civil War (1861-1865), the Fresnel lens was removed from Round Island Lighthouse by Confederate soldiers and transported to Montgomery, Alabama for safekeeping.

Round Island Lighthouse was automated in 1944 but was deactivated 5 years later.  After deactivation, the U.S. Coast Guard maintained the lighthouse as a day beacon, without illumination, through 1954.  Given the lack of historical information about the lighthouse for navigation, its significance is thought to be mainly as a beacon for accessing Pascagoula Harbor.

In 1955, the lighthouse, dwelling, pier, and outbuildings were declared excess property by the General Services Administration. Through the years, the lighthouse suffered from vandalism, disrepair, and wave erosion. The lighthouse was added the National Register of Historic Places on October 9, 1986.

Destruction and relocation

In September 1998, Round Island Lighthouse was toppled by Hurricane Georges.  Plans were made to rebuild the lighthouse at its original location on Round Island, and construction was initiated.  However, in August 2005, rebuilding efforts ended when Hurricane Katrina destroyed the partially reconstructed lighthouse.
Because of the precarious location on Round Island, that exposed the lighthouse to erosion and destruction from future storms, the Pascagoula City Council made a decision to rebuild the lighthouse within the City of Pascagoula, using as much of the original construction materials as could be salvaged from the island.  As of 2012, the original base of the lighthouse and the restored lantern gallery had been secured at their new location, just south of U.S. Route 90 in Pascagoula.  By July 2014, the exterior of the lighthouse had been restored and topped with the original lantern gallery.

References

External links

Lighthouses on the National Register of Historic Places in Mississippi
Lighthouses completed in 1859
Mississippi Landmarks
Buildings and structures demolished in 1998
National Register of Historic Places in Jackson County, Mississippi
Buildings and structures completed in 2014